Signe Øye (born 2 June 1945 in Nord-Aukra) is a Norwegian politician for the Labour Party.

She was elected to the Norwegian Parliament from Østfold in 1993, and was re-elected on three occasions.

On the local level she was a member of Hobøl municipal council from 1983 to 1990. She chaired the local party chapter from 1994 to 2000, and the regional chapter since 2002.

Outside politics she worked as a secretary in Spydeberg municipality from 1974 to 1990, and as a consultant in Hobøl municipality from 1990 to 1993.

References

1945 births
Living people
People from Aukra
Labour Party (Norway) politicians
Members of the Storting
Østfold politicians
Women members of the Storting
21st-century Norwegian politicians
21st-century Norwegian women politicians
20th-century Norwegian politicians
20th-century Norwegian women politicians